Mary Evelyn Northridge is an American epidemiologist and the former editor-in-chief of the American Journal of Public Health (2001-2015).
She was the journal's first female editor-in-chief.
Northridge obtained a BA at University of Virginia (chemistry, 1980), an MPH at Rutgers University (environmental health, 1988), and a PhD at Columbia University (epidemiology, 1993).

References

External links
Columbia faculty page
NYU faculty page

American women epidemiologists
American epidemiologists
University of Virginia alumni
Rutgers University alumni
Columbia University Mailman School of Public Health alumni
20th-century American women scientists
21st-century American women scientists
Year of birth missing (living people)
Living people